Miss USA 2016 was the 65th Miss USA pageant. It was held at the T-Mobile Arena in Las Vegas, Nevada on June 5, 2016. Terrence J and Julianne Hough all hosted for the first time, while Ashley Graham served as the backstage host. All fifty states and the District of Columbia competed. Olivia Jordan of Oklahoma crowned her successor, Deshauna Barber of the District of Columbia, at the end of the event. Barber became the first African American to win the Miss USA title since Crystle Stewart in 2008, and this was District of Columbia's third title and the first title since 2002. Barber represented the United States at the Miss Universe 2016 pageant, where she placed in the Top 9.

This was the first edition of the Miss USA pageant to be held under the ownership of WME/IMG, which purchased the Miss Universe Organization from Donald Trump on September 14, 2015, three days after NBCUniversal sold him its 50% interest in the organization in exchange for Trump's dropping a breach of contract lawsuit he filed against the media company in August for terminating NBC's contract to televise the Miss Universe and Miss USA pageants. It was also the first Miss USA pageant to be broadcast on Fox after signed an agreement in October 2015.

For the first time, a 52nd entrant for the pageant was decided via a nationwide search through social media voting.

Background

Location
On April 5, the Miss Universe Organization announced that the competition would be hosted at T-Mobile Arena in Las Vegas, and a seventh time hosting the state in nine years.

Hosts and performers
On May 25, it was announced that the competition would be hosted by Terrence J, while Ashley Graham would serve as backstage host. A week later, Julianne Hough was announced as the second host would work alongside Terrence J. Hough is a dancer and judge on Dancing with the Stars.

Also on May 25, Backstreet Boys and Nashville Star alum Chris Young were announced as the musical guests.

Selection of participants
Delegates from 50 states and the District of Columbia were chosen in state pageants held from July 2015 to January 2016. The first state pageant was Florida, held on July 11, 2015 (the day before the Miss USA 2015 final competition), and the final pageant was Kentucky, held on January 31, 2016; fifteen of these delegates were former Miss Teen USA state winners (made the highest number ever surpassed the previous number of 12 former teens in Miss USA 2014), two of them were former Miss America state winners and three of them were former Miss America's Outstanding Teen state winners.

Two state titleholders were appointed as replacements after the original titleholders were unable to compete. Stormy Keffeler, the original Miss Washington USA 2016, resigned in January 2016 after pleaded guilty from disclosure of DUI in April 2015. She was replaced by Kelsey Schmidt, who was the first runner-up of the Miss Washington USA 2016 pageant, and Allie Dunn, the original Miss North Carolina USA 2016, resigned two weeks before the start of the Miss USA 2016 competition when she was falling ill and missed the start of pageant activities prevented from entering registration form. She was replaced by Devin Gant, who was the first runner-up of Miss North Carolina USA 2016 pageant and made a last minute trip to Las Vegas as the pageant activities were already started.

Results

§ Voted into the Top 15 by the public as the "People's Choice".

Awards

Order of announcements

Top 15

Top 10

Top 5

Top 3

Historical significance 
 District of Columbia wins competition for the third time. 
 Hawaii earns the 1st runner-up position for the first time and reaches its highest placement since Brook Lee won in 1997. Ironically, Lee went on to win the Miss Universe title in 1997.
 Georgia earns the 2nd runner-up position for the sixth time. The last time it placed this was in 2014.
 California finishes as Top 5 for the first time and reached its highest placement since Alyssa Campanella won 2011.
 Alabama finishes as Top 5 for the first time and reached its highest placement since 2013.
 States that placed in semifinals the previous year were Alabama, Arizona, Hawaii, Oklahoma and Virginia. 
 South Dakota made its third cut and reaches into the top 10, becoming its highest placement of the state.
 Alabama placed for the seventh consecutive year.
 Arizona, Oklahoma and Virginia placed for the third consecutive year.
 Hawaii made its second consecutive placement.
 California, Georgia and South Carolina last placed in 2014.
 Connecticut, Ohio and West Virginia last placed in 2013.
 Arkansas last placed in 2012.
 Missouri last placed in 2011.
 District of Columbia last placed in 2006.
 South Dakota last placed in 1974.
 Louisiana and Nevada break an ongoing streak of placements since 2012.
 Maryland breaks an ongoing streak of placements since 2011.

Miss 52 USA 
In May 2016, a 52nd contestant took part in the competition via social media voting. The Miss Universe Organization along with the fashion agency Sherri Hill decided to make a competition online where different women from all the US competed. Finally, 10 women were selected by a panel of judges, and these 10 finalists were revealed on May 10, 2016. The winner between these 10 candidates competed as Miss 52 USA in the Miss USA 2016 pageant on June 5, 2016.  The winner was announced on May 18, 2016, and Alexandra Miller from Oklahoma City, Oklahoma was named as Miss 52 USA.

The 10 selected finalists were:

The panel of judges that selected the 10 finalists were:
 Alessandra Garcia, American plus-size model.
 Ashley Wagner, American figure skater.
 Andrew Serrano, American IMG Fashion Director of Global Public Relations.
 Lauren Giraldo, American social media star.
 Pia Alonzo Wurtzbach, Miss Universe 2015 from the Philippines.
 Sherri Hill, American fashion designer and businesswoman.

Pageant

Preliminary round
Prior to the final competition, the delegates competed in the preliminary competition, which involves private interviews with the judges and a presentation show where they compete in swim wear and evening gown. It was held on June 1, 2016, and was broadcast on the Miss Universe website and mobile app and was hosted by Nick Teplitz and Olivia Jordan.

Judges
 Fred Nelson  – President/Executive Producer of the People's Choice Awards
 Jimmy Nguyen  – Entertainment and digital media lawyer, diversity advocate, blogger, and technology advisor
 Joey Boukadakis  – Writer, director, producer, and media executive
 Keltie Knight – Correspondent and weekend host of CBS's The Insider
 Kristin Conte  – Marketing and communications executive and event creator
 Nick Phelps  – Global Alliance Director at Droga5
 Rebecca Bienstock  – West Coast Bureau Chief at Us Weekly magazine

Finals
During the final competition, the top fifteen competed in swim wear, while the top ten also competed in evening gown. The top five also competed in a submitted question round. Unlike in previous years, the third runner-up and the fourth runner-up were not awarded as the format was revived in Miss Universe 2015, and instead the judges would determine those three finalists to advance in the top three. The top three also competed in the same question round and a final runway, and the winner was decided by a panel of judges alongside the two runners-up.

Judges
 Ali Landry – Miss USA 1996 from Louisiana
 Crystle Stewart – Miss USA 2008 from Texas
 Joe Zee – Editor in Chief and Executive Creative Officer of Yahoo Fashion
 Laura Brown – Features/Special Projects and executive director of Harper's Bazaar magazine
 Nigel Barker – Fashion photographer and the host of UK and US versions of The Face

Contestants
52 delegates competed for Miss USA 2016:

International broadcasters

Television
: Fox
Africa: DSTV Mzansi Magic (delayed broadcast)
Asia-Pacific: Star World
: Venevisión

Notes

References

External links

 Miss USA official website

2016
June 2016 events in the United States
2016 beauty pageants
Beauty pageants in the United States
2016 in Nevada